Corleto may refer to:

Localities
Corleto Monforte, Italian municipality of the province of Salerno
Corleto Perticara, Italian municipality of the province of Potenza

Personalities
Ignacio Corleto, Argentine Rugby Union footballer